Harry Pelling Gill (9 March 1855 – 25 May 1916), commonly referred to as H. P. Gill or Harry P. Gill, was an English-born Australian art curator, teacher and painter, who lived in Adelaide, South Australia for much of his life.

Background
Gill was born at Brighton, Sussex, England, the son of Alfred Gill and his wife Frances Elizabeth, née Pelling. Gill studied at the Brighton, Hove and Sussex Grammar School, the Brighton School of Art, and at the South Kensington School of Art (National Art Training School), where he won a scholarship in 1877.

In 1882 Gill was appointed master of the School of Design at Adelaide, selected by the Board of Governors of the South Australian Institute, and held this position until 1909, when it was taken over by the Education Department and became the Adelaide School of Art, with Gill as Principal and Examiner.  Gill brought with him the South Kensington system of art education, which entailed copying with great exactitude.

He founded the Adelaide Art Circle in early 1890 as an exclusive club, limited to 12 members and restricted to professional artists. It held several exhibitions that were clearly dominated by Gill's work and was dissolved in 1892. In June that year Gill was elected president of the moribund South Australian Society of Arts and most committee positions were taken by members of the Circle, and marked a revival of the Society's fortunes. Later that year a split in the Society resulted in the formation of the Adelaide Easel Club.

Gill published The Straight and Crooked Paths of Studentship in 1894. He was appointed honorary curator of the Art Gallery of South Australia, and in 1899 visited Europe where, with the assistance of a committee, he spent £10,000 on works of art. He was also responsible for purchasing works of young Australian artists such as Tom Roberts, Hans Heysen and Frederick McCubbin.

Gill was a longtime member of the South Australian Society of Arts and its president from 1909 to 1911. He was an Associate of the Royal College of Art, London, and a Freemason.

He resigned from the School of Art on 1 July 1915 on account of ill health, and while on a voyage to England, for reasons of health, died in the Mediterranean between Marseilles and Gibraltar on 25 May 1916, and was buried at sea. He was survived by his wife and two sons.

Gill had a good reputation as a teacher and lecturer. One oil and three of his water-colours are in the Art Gallery of South Australia. One of his students was the architect Herbert Jory.

Family
Harry Pelling Gill married Annie Waring Wright, a granddaughter of T. S. O'Halloran, on 29 April 1886. They had two sons:
Lancelot Waring "Lance" Gill (22 August 1887 – 31 December 1969), married Isabel May Moore on 24 December 1912. Isabel was the third daughter of S. W. Moore MLA for NSW.
Erold Waring Gill (21 May 1891 – 25 July 1916) He died of wounds received during the Somme Offensive.

References

External links

1855 births
1916 deaths
19th-century English painters
20th-century English painters
Associates of the Royal College of Art
Australian art critics
Australian art teachers
Australian curators
Australian painters
Australian people of English descent
English male painters
People who died at sea
20th-century English male artists
19th-century English male artists